Mikael Josh Marqués de Pombal Vivar (born 8 September 2001) is a Swedish professional footballer who plays as a defender for Major League Soccer side Minnesota United.

Early life
Born in Stockholm, Marqués lived with his family in Märsta, Sweden, before they moved to Spain for six years, returning to Sweden when Marqués was 12 years old. He is of Brazilian descent, and holds both Swedish and Brazilian passports. He played youth football for Kulladals FF, Oxie SK, and Landskrona BoIS before joining IFK Malmo for whom he was promoted to the senior squad aged 16, initially playing full-back.

Career
Playing for IFK Malmö Marqués played a total of 38 league matches and scored one goal for the club in the 2018 and 2019 seasons. From 2020 Marques played in the Superettan for Jönköpings Södra IF. Marqués made his Superettan debut on 16 June, 2020 in a 0–1 loss against GAIS. He joined AFC Eskilstuna in the same division in January 2022.  Marqués made 28 league appearances for Eskilstuna in 2022. On 17 January, 2023 Marqués was confirmed as signing for Minnesota United of Major League Soccer for a reported $250,000 fee.

References

External links
 

Living people
2001 births
Swedish footballers
Swedish people of Brazilian descent
Superettan players
Association football defenders
IFK Malmö Fotboll players
Jönköpings Södra IF players
AFC Eskilstuna players
Minnesota United FC players
Footballers from Stockholm